Francesca James (born January 23, 1949) is an American actress, writer, singer, composer, director and producer.

Biography
She grew up in Michigan, where she began her professional career in the theater at the age of 16.

After studying theater at Carnegie-Mellon University, she moved to New York City, where she worked in theater, and for several years, in daytime dramas, including The Secret Storm, As the World Turns, One Life to Live and All My Children (for which she was awarded a Best Supporting Actress Emmy in 1980).

James made an impression playing the character of Marcy Wade on One Life to Live from 1970 to 1972, and was afterward asked to join the cast of All My Children as Kitty Shea, a dancer searching for her birth mother. She initially departed that program around its expansion to a full hour to become a singer. She later met Agnes Nixon, the show's creator, and expressed an interest to rejoin the show. Her character Kitty had died, but Nixon created the character of Kelly Cole, an addicted nightclub performer who was also Kitty's long-lost twin sister. She was given a chance to sing and even composed the song "Colored Lights" when another character, Tad Martin, was suffering from addiction.

James was written off All My Children in 1980 and then pursued a career in directing. Her directing credits include All My Children and Loving. She then moved to Los Angeles as a producer, where she worked on General Hospital, Santa Barbara and Days of Our Lives. While she was producing General Hospital in 1994–1995, the show was twice awarded the Daytime Emmy as Outstanding Drama Series. In 1995, James returned to New York and All My Children, which earned its second Outstanding Daytime Drama with her as producer.

In 1998, James left the production team of All My Children, but stayed with ABC Daytime in a consulting position and as the head of its writer development program for the next year.

Awards and nominations
Daytime Emmy Awards
 win (2005; Best Special Class Series, Starting Over)
 win (1998; Best Drama Series, All My Children)
 win (1995, 1996; Best Drama Series, General Hospital)
 win (1980; Best Supporting Actress, All My Children)
 nomination (1997, 1999; Best Drama Series, All My Children)
 nomination (1983–1985, 1987; Best Directing, All My Children)

References

External links
 

1949 births
Actresses from Michigan
American soap opera actresses
American television actresses
American soap opera writers
Television producers from California
American women television producers
Daytime Emmy Award winners
Daytime Emmy Award for Outstanding Supporting Actress in a Drama Series winners
Living people
People from Montebello, California
Soap opera producers
Screenwriters from California
American women television writers
Place of birth missing (living people)
Women soap opera writers
21st-century American women